The European Molecular Biology Laboratory (EMBL) is an intergovernmental organization dedicated to molecular biology research and is supported by 28 member states, one prospect state, and one associate member state. EMBL was created in 1974 and is funded by public research money from its member states. Research at EMBL is conducted by approximately 110 independent research and service groups and teams covering the spectrum of molecular biology and bioinformatics. The Laboratory operates from six sites: the main laboratory in Heidelberg, and sites in Hinxton (the European Bioinformatics Institute (EBI), in England), Grenoble (France), Hamburg (Germany), Rome (Italy) and Barcelona (Spain). EMBL groups and laboratories perform basic research in molecular biology and molecular medicine as well as train scientists, students, and visitors. The organization aids in the development of services, new instruments and methods, and technology in its member states. Israel is the only full member state located outside Europe.

History 

EMBL was the idea of Leó Szilárd, James Watson and John Kendrew. Their goal was to create an international research centre, similar to CERN, to rival the strongly American-dominated field of molecular biology. Kendrew served as the first Director-general of EMBL until 1982 and was succeeded by Lennart Philipson. From 1993 to 2005, Fotis Kafatos, served as director and was succeeded by Iain Mattaj, EMBL's fourth director, from 2005 to 2018. In January 2019, Edith Heard became the fifth director of EMBL and the first woman to hold this position.

Heard announced the organisation's five-year scientific programme Molecules to Ecosystems on 19 January 2022.

Research 

Each EMBL site has a specific research field. The EMBL-EBI is a hub for bioinformatics research and services, developing and maintaining a large number of scientific databases that are free of charge. At Grenoble and Hamburg, research is focused on structural biology.

The EMBL Rome site is dedicated to the study of epigenetics and neurobiology. Scientists at EMBL Barcelona are exploring how tissues and organs function and develop, in health and disease. At the headquarters in Heidelberg, there are units in cell biology and biophysics, developmental biology, genome biology, and structural and computational biology, as well as service groups complementing the aforementioned research fields.

Many scientific breakthroughs have been made at EMBL. The first systematic genetic analysis of embryonic development in the fruit fly was conducted at EMBL by Christiane Nüsslein-Volhard and Eric Wieschaus, for which they were awarded the Nobel Prize in Physiology or Medicine in 1995. In the early 1980s, Jacques Dubochet and his team at EMBL developed cryogenic electron microscopy for biological structures. They were rewarded with the 2017 Nobel Prize in Chemistry.

Scientific Services 
EMBL has identified as a core mission the provision of advanced experimental and data services to external researchers, including structural biology, imaging and sequencing facilities at its five European sites. In 2021, EMBL completed a new centre for high-resolution light and electron microscopy at its Heidelberg Headquarters - the EMBL Imaging Centre. The centre is open to visiting scientists worldwide and provides a unique service facility for the life sciences by combining the latest imaging technologies with expert advice and industry-led developments not yet otherwise available.

Training 

Advanced training is one of EMBL's five core missions. Over the years, the Laboratory has established a number of training activities, of which the EMBL International PhD Programme (EIPP) is the flagship - it has a student body of about 200, and since 1997 has had the right to award its own degree, although currently students receive their degrees from partner universities. Other activities include the postdoctoral programme, including the EMBL Interdisciplinary Postdoctoral programme (EIPOD) and the Visitor Programme.

EMBL Advanced Training Centre 
In March 2010, the EMBL Advanced Training Centre (ATC) was inaugurated on the main campus in Heidelberg. Shaped in the form of a double helix, it hosts scientific conferences, seminars and training courses, and provides access to training laboratories and lecture halls.

The ATC also hosts EMBL's European Learning Lab for the Life Sciences (ELLS) which provides training for secondary school teachers on the latest developments in molecular biology, and runs a student outreach program.

Science and society 
EMBL also runs an active Science and Society Programme which offers activities and events on current questions in life science research for the general public and the scientific community.

Membership 

EMBL is currently supported by 28 member states, one associate member state, and one prospect member state.

See also 
 European Molecular Biology Organization

Notes and references

External links 

Educational institutions established in 1974
Heidelberg
Intergovernmental organizations established by treaty
International research institutes
International scientific organizations based in Europe
Medical and health organisations based in Baden-Württemberg
Molecular biology institutes
Medical research institutes in Germany
Science and technology in Grenoble